Callistege intercalaris  is a moth of the family Erebidae. It is found from Arizona to Texas.

The wingspan is 30–33 mm. Adults are on wing from July to September.

References

External links

Moths described in 1882
Callistege